Charles Kemball CBE PRSE FRS FRSC FRIC (27 March 1923, in Edinburgh – 4 September 1998, in Tyninghame) was a Scottish chemist who served as president of the Royal Society of Edinburgh (1988–91) and as president of the Royal Institute of Chemistry (1974-6). He pioneered the use of mass spectrometry. and was a leading expert in heterogeneous catalysis.

Life
He was born in Edinburgh on 27 March 1923 the son of Charles Henry Kemball FRSE (1889-1964), a dental surgeon, and his wife, Janet White. He was educated at Edinburgh Academy 1929 to 1940. In December 1939 he was awarded a scholarship to Trinity College, Cambridge where he graduated MA before gaining two doctorates (ScD and PhD).

On 16 October 1946 Kemball sailed on the Queen Elizabeth from Southampton to New York. This was the first voyage of the newly-converted liner after her serving as a troop ship during WWII. Kemball was the recipient of a Commonwealth Fund Scholarship, on his way to Princeton, to work with Professor H S Taylor, a leading expert on heterogeneous catalysis. Princeton was at the forefront of research on catalysis, and "the 'Princeton experience' was the key to the distinguished career that Charles was to have in the field of heterogeneous catalysis".

Kemball sailed on the same ship back to England in September 1947, and joined the Department of Colloid Science at Cambridge to take up his Research Fellowship at Trinity. In the summer of 1949 Kemball moved to the Department of Physical Chemistry. Having reassembled his newly-introduced mass spectrometer system, he started on an extensive period of research on the exchange reactions of hydrocarbons with deuterium by using evaporated metal films as catalysts; this was a significant a development of his work with Taylor at Princeton.

In 1951 he was a recipient of the Meldola Medal from the Chemical Society, which is awarded to the most promising British chemist under the age of 32.

He was Professor of Physical & Inorganic Chemistry at Queen's University Belfast (1954–66) and Professor of Chemistry at the University of Edinburgh (1966–87).

He was elected a Fellow of the Royal Society of London in 1965 and a Fellow of the Royal Society of Edinburgh in 1967. His proposers for the latter were Sir Edmund Hirst, Neil Campbell, Duncan Taylor and James Pickering Kendall. He twice served as Vice President to the Society: 1971 to 1974 and 1982 to 1985. He served as President 1988 to 1991. He won the Society's Gunning Victoria Jubilee Prize 1976-1980.

Kemball received an Honorary Doctorate from Heriot-Watt University in 1980. He was appointed CBE in the 1991 New Year Honours.

He died at home in Tyninghame in East Lothian on 4 September 1998.

Appointments, awards and honours
Kemball has earned the following awards and honours:

Family

In 1956 he married Kathleen (Kay) Purvis Lynd. They had one son, Alan Kemball, and two daughters, Mary and Heather. Each of his three children had three children and he was survived by nine grandchildren.

References

Scottish physical chemists
Presidents of the Royal Society of Edinburgh
Commanders of the Order of the British Empire
Fellows of the Royal Society
Fellows of the Royal Society of Chemistry
Academics of Queen's University Belfast
Academics of the University of Edinburgh
Princeton University people
Academics of the University of Cambridge
Scientists from Edinburgh
People educated at Edinburgh Academy
Alumni of Trinity College, Cambridge
1923 births
1998 deaths